Adrianus Willem "Aad" van der Vaart (born 12 July 1959) is a Dutch professor of Stochastics at the Delft Institute of Applied Mathematics at Delft University of Technology.

Life
Van der Vaart was born in Vlaardingen on 12 July 1959. He earned his PhD at Leiden University in 1987 with a thesis titled: "Statistical estimation in large parameter spaces". He became a professor at the Vrije Universiteit Amsterdam in 1997. He was appointed as professor of Stochastics at Leiden University in 2012. In 2021 he moved to the Technical University of Delft.

Honours
Van der Vaart was elected a member of the Royal Netherlands Academy of Arts and Sciences in 2009. In 2010 he was an Invited Speaker at the International Congress of Mathematicians in Hyderabad, India. He was the recipient of a European Research Council Advanced Grant in 2012. In 2015 he was one of four winners of the Dutch Spinoza Prize and received a 2.5 million euro grant. He was awarded the prize for his research on mathematical models that help track genes for cancer research. On being awarded the prize Van der Vaart stated that 2.5 million euro was too much, claiming he could have 35 postdoctoral and Ph.D. students work with the grant.

In June 2019 van der Vaart was made a Knight of the Order of the Netherlands Lion.

References

External links
 Profile at Leiden University

1959 births
Living people
Dutch statisticians
Knights of the Order of the Netherlands Lion
Leiden University alumni
Academic staff of Leiden University
Members of the Royal Netherlands Academy of Arts and Sciences
People from Vlaardingen
Spinoza Prize winners
Academic staff of Vrije Universiteit Amsterdam
Mathematical statisticians